Maria Holm (1845, Riga – 1912) was a Latvian poet and writer. 

Her works included:
 Lustspiele, Novellen, Romane, u. a. "Thomas Kerkhoven" (1906, 1918); 
 übers. aus d. Russ.; "Farbiger Abglanz", 
 Erinn. an L. Thoma, M. Dauthendey u. A. Langen (1940); "Ich – kleingeschrieben", 
 Heitere Erlebnisse eines Verlegers (1932)

References
 BBLD - Baltisches biografisches Lexikon digital

1845 births
1912 deaths
Writers from Riga
People from Kreis Riga
Baltic-German people
Latvian poets
German-language poets
19th-century Latvian writers
Latvian women poets
19th-century women writers